Jamush Olan-e Olya (also Romanized as Jāmūsh Olan-e ‘Olyā; also known as Gāvmīsh Owlan-e ‘Olyā) is a village in Naqdi Rural District, Meshgin-e Sharqi District, Meshgin Shahr County, Ardabil Province, Iran. At the 2006 census, its population was 28, in 4 families.

References 

Towns and villages in Meshgin Shahr County